Gamma-tubulin complex component 6 is a protein that in humans is encoded by the TUBGCP6 gene.
It is part of the gamma tubulin complex, which required for microtubule nucleation at the centrosome.

See also 
 Tubulin
 TUBGCP2
 TUBGCP3
 TUBGCP4
 TUBGCP5

References

Further reading